Josef Effertz (March 29, 1907 – May 31, 1984) was a German farmer and politician of the Free Democratic Party (FDP) and former member of the German Bundestag.

Life 
From 1954 until his resignation on 26 September 1961, Effertz was a member of the North Rhine-Westphalian state parliament. He was a member of the German Bundestag from 1961 until his resignation on 4 March 1968. He had entered parliament in both legislative periods via the North Rhine-Westphalia state list.

Literature

References

1907 births
1984 deaths
Members of the Bundestag for North Rhine-Westphalia
Members of the Bundestag 1965–1969
Members of the Bundestag 1961–1965
Members of the Bundestag for the Free Democratic Party (Germany)
Members of the Landtag of North Rhine-Westphalia
German farmers